Amparín Serrano (31 October 1965 – 12 August 2022) born Amparo Serrano was a Mexican graphic designer, famous for having created the Distroller brand, "Virgencita Plis" that caricatured the image of Our Lady of Guadalupe, and "Ksi Meritos/Neonate Babies" that featured baby dolls, but were criticized for politicizing the Abortion debate to kids.

Personal life 
Amparo Serrano is the daughter of Manuel Espinosa Yglesias, Mexican banker, and Amparo Espinosa Rugarcía. Amparo Serrano married David West, American producer and president of Westwood Entertainment, and was the mother of Amparo Alexia West, artistically known as Minnie West, a Mexican actress, and Camila West. Amparín was originally a member of the music acts Media Luna with singles "La Luna", "Dime por qué" o "Sueños", and Flans with Ilse, Ivonne, and Mimi before they rose to fame as a Girl group in the mid-1980s to the early 1990s.

See also 

 Amparo Serrano Iglesias

References 

1965 births
2022 deaths
Mexican graphic designers
Artists from Mexico City